This is a list of women's Swedish Short Course Swimming Championships champions.

Current program

50m freestyle

1953 – Monica Peters, Limhamns SS
1954 – Marianne Lundqvist, SK Neptun
1955 – Eva Varde, SK Poseidon
1956 – Kate Jobson, Varbergs GIF
1957 – Kate Jobson, Varbergs GIF
1983 – Agneta Eriksson, Västerås SS
1984 – Stina Persson, Helsingborgs SS
1985 – Agneta Eriksson, Västerås SS
1986 – Agneta Eriksson, Västerås SS
1987 – Karin Furuhed, Borlänge SS
1988 – Karin Furuhed, Borlänge SS
1989 – Linda Olofsson, Älvsby SS
1990 – Louise Karlsson, Skärets SS
1991 – Ellenor Svensson, Norrköpings KK
1992 – Linda Olofsson, Sundsvalls SS
1993 – Linda Olofsson, Sundsvalls SS
1994 – Linda Olofsson, Sundsvalls SS
1995 – Linda Olofsson, Södertälje SS
1996 – Linda Olofsson, Södertälje SS
1997 – Therese Alshammar, SK Neptun
1998 – Therese Alshammar, SK Neptun
1999 – Therese Alshammar, SK Neptun
2000 – Therese Alshammar, SK Neptun
2001 – Therese Alshammar, SK Neptun
2002 – Therese Alshammar, SK Neptun
2003 – Therese Alshammar, SK Neptun
2004 – Therese Alshammar, SK Neptun
2005 – Therese Alshammar, SK Neptun
2006 – Therese Alshammar, SK Neptun
2007 – Claire Hedenskog, Göteborg Sim

100m freestyle

1972 – Anita Zarnowiecki, Simavdelningen 1902
1973 – Anita Zarnowiecki, Simavdelningen 1902
1974 – Diana Olsson, Stockholmspolisens IF
1975 – Eva Andersson, SK Najaden
1976 – Ida Hansson, Simavdelningen 1902
1977 – Gunn-Berit Myrvall, Järfälla SS
1978 – Birgitta Jönsson, Avesta SS
1979 – Birgitta Jönsson, Avesta SS
1980 – Agneta Eriksson, Västerås SS
1981 – Agneta Eriksson, Västerås SS
1982 – Agneta Eriksson, Västerås SS
1983 – Agneta Eriksson, Västerås SS
1984 – Agneta Eriksson, Västerås SS
1985 – Agneta Eriksson, Västerås SS
1986 – Agneta Eriksson, Västerås SS
1987 – Karin Furuhed, Borlänge SS
1988 – Karin Furuhed, Borlänge SS
1989 – Helena Kälvehed, SK Korrugal
1990 – Eva Nyberg, Mariestads SS
1991 – Ellenor Svensson, Norrköpings KK
1992 – Linda Olofsson, Sundsvalls SS
1993 – Ellenor Svensson, Norrköpings KK
1994 – Susanne Lööw, Södertälje SS
1995 – Johanna Sjöberg, Helsingborgs SS
1996 – Linda Olofsson, Södertälje SS
1997 – Therese Alshammar, SK Neptun
1998 – Therese Alshammar, SK Neptun
1999 – Louise Jöhncke, Spårvägens SF
2000 – Malin Svahnström, Väsby SS
2001 – Therese Alshammar, SK Neptun
2002 – Therese Alshammar, SK Neptun
2003 – Therese Alshammar, SK Neptun
2004 – Johanna Sjöberg, Spårvägens SF
2005 – Josefin Lillhage, Väsby SS
2006 – Josefin Lillhage, Väsby SS
2007 – Ida Marko-Varga, SK Ran

200m freestyle

1956 – Anita Hellström, SK Neptun
1957 – Anita Hellström, SK Neptun
1958 – Barbro Andresson, SK Ran
1959 – Bibbi Segerström, SK Neptun
1960 – Bibbi Segerström, SK Neptun
1961 – Jane Cederqvist, SK Neptun
1962 – Inger Thorngren, Upsala SS
1963 – Ann-Christine Hagberg, SK Neptun
1964 – Ann-Christine Hagberg, SK Neptun
1965 – Ann-Christine Hagberg, SK Neptun
1966 – Ann-Charlott Lilja, SK Najaden
1967 – Elisabeth Berglund, Timrå AIF
1968 – Elisabeth Ljunggren-Morris, SK Neptun
1969 – Vera Kock, Timrå AIF
1970 – Anita Zarnowiecki, Simavdelningen 1902
1971 – Gunilla Jonsson, Malmö SS
1976 – Pia Mårtensson, Varbergs GIF
1977 – Pia Mårtensson, Varbergs GIF
1978 – Birgitta Jönsson, Avesta SS
1979 – Birgitta Jönsson, Avesta SS
1980 – Agneta Eriksson, Västerås SS
1981 – Agneta Eriksson, Västerås SS
1982 – Agneta Eriksson, Västerås SS
1983 – Agneta Eriksson, Västerås SS
1984 – Agneta Eriksson, Västerås SS
1985 – Suzanne Nilsson, Simavdelningen 1902
1986 – Agneta Eriksson, Västerås SS
1987 – Agneta Eriksson, Västerås SS
1988 – Suzanne Nilsson, Helsingborgs SS
1989 – Malin Gustavsson, Kristianstads SLS
1990 – Malin Nilssson, Malmö KK
1991 – Malin Nilsson, Malmö KK
1992 – Malin Nilsson, Malmö KK
1993 – Malin Nilsson, Malmö KK
1994 – Malin Nilsson, Malmö KK
1995 – Louise Jöhncke, Spårvägens SF
1996 – Josefin Lillhage, Simavdelningen 1902
1997 – Johanna Sjöberg, Helsingborgs SS
1998 – Malin Svahnström, Väsby SS
1999 – Josefin Lillhage, Göteborg Sim
2000 – Malin Svahnström, Väsby SS
2001 – Malin Svahnström, Väsby SS
2002 – Johanna Sjöberg, Södertälje SS
2003 – Josefin Lillhage, Väsby SS
2004 – Josefin Lillhage, Väsby SS
2005 – Josefin Lillhage, Väsby SS
2006 – Josefin Lillhage, Väsby SS
2007 – Petra Granlund, Väsby SS

400m freestyle

1972 – Carina Eriksson, Gävle SS
1973 – Anita Zarnowiecki, Simavdelningen 1902
1974 – Anita Zarnowiecki, Simavdelningen 1902
1975 – Else Gunsten, Kristianstads SLS
1976 – Gunilla Lundberg, Borlänge SS
1977 – Susanne Ackum, Borlänge SS
1978 – Anette Fredriksson, Simavdelningen 1902
1979 – Susanne Ackum, Borlänge SS
1980 – Monica Parsmark, Upsala SS
1981 – Tina Gustafsson, Norrköpings KK
1982 – Ann Linder, SK Najaden
1983 – Ann Linder, SK Najaden
1984 – Ann Linder, SK Najaden
1985 – Suzanne Nilsson, Simavdelningen 1902
1986 – Suzanne Nilsson, Simavdelningen 1902
1987 – Anette Möller, Varbergs Sim
1988 – Suzanne Nilsson, Helsingborgs SS
1989 – Linda Rönnbäck, Luleå SS
1990 – Malin Nilsson, Malmö KK
1991 – Malin Nilsson, Malmö KK
1992 – Malin Nilsson, Malmö KK
1993 – Malin Nilsson, Malmö KK
1994 – Malin Nilsson, Malmö KK
1995 – Malin Nilsson, Simavdelningen 1902
1996 – Åsa Sandlund, Linköpings ASS
1997 – Johanna Sjöberg, Helsingborgs SS
1998 – Åsa Sandlund, Linköpings ASS
1999 – Lotta Wänberg, Malmö KK
2000 – Josefin Lillhage, Väsby SS
2001 – Ann Berglund, Jönköpings SS
2002 – Josefin Lillhage, Väsby SS
2003 – Josefin Lillhage, Väsby SS
2004 – Josefin Lillhage, Väsby SS
2005 – Josefin Lillhage, Väsby SS
2006 – Josefin Lillhage, Väsby SS
2007 – Gabriella Fagundez, SK Ran

800m freestyle

1961 – Jane Cederqvist, SK Neptun
1962 – Ann-Charlott Lilja, SK Najaden
1963 – Elisabeth Ljunggren, SK Neptun
1964 – Ann-Charlott Lilja, SK Najaden
1965 – Ann-Charlott Lilja, SK Najaden
1966 – Ann-Charlott Lilja, SK Najaden
1968 – Elisabeth Ljunggren-Morris, SK Neptun
1969 – Vera Kock, Timrå AIF
1970 – Gunilla Wickman, Stockholmspolisens IF
1971 – Gunilla Jonsson, Malmö SS
1972 – Else Gunsten, Kristianstads SLS
1973 – Else Gunsten, Kristianstads SLS
1974 – Gunilla Lundberg, Umeå SS
1975 – Else Gunsten, Kristianstads SLS
1976 – Gunilla Lundberg, Borlänge SS
1977 – Susanne Ackum, Borlänge SS
1978 – Susanne Ackum, Borlänge SS
1985 – Suzanne Nilsson, Simavdelningen 1902
1986 – Suzanne Nilsson, Simavdelningen 1902
1987 – Anna Rosengren, SK Elfsborg
1988 – Linda Rönnbäck, Luleå SS
1989 – Linda Rönnbäck, Luleå SS
1990 – Malin Nilssson, Malmö KK
1991 – Malin Nilsson, Malmö KK
1992 – Malin Nilsson, Malmö KK
1993 – Malin Nilsson, Malmö KK
1994 – Malin Nilsson, Malmö KK
1995 – Malin Nilsson, Simavdelningen 1902
1996 – Åsa Sandlund, Linköpings ASS
1997 – Åsa Sandlund, Linköpings ASS
1998 – Åsa Sandlund, Linköpings ASS
1999 – Ann Berglund, Jönköpings SS
2000 – Maria Öberg, Ystads SS
2001 – Ann Berglund, Jönköpings SS
2002 – Ann Berglund, Jönköpings SS
2003 – Teresia Gimholt, S77 Stenungsund
2004 – Teresia Gimholt, S77 Stenungsund
2005 – Teresia Gimholt, S77 Stenungsund
2006 – Gabriella Fagundez, SK Ran
2007 – Gabriella Fagundez, SK Ran

50m backstroke

1990 – Annelie Johansson, Västerås SS
1991 – Therese Alshammar, Järfälla SS
1992 – Therèse Lundin, Helsingborgs SS
1993 – Therese Alshammar, SK Neptun
1994 – Therese Alshammar, SK Neptun
1995 – Therese Alshammar, SK Neptun
1996 – Therese Alshammar, Helsingborgs SS
1997 – Therese Alshammar, SK Neptun
1998 – Therese Alshammar, SK Neptun
1999 – Therese Alshammar, SK Neptun
2000 – Therese Alshammar, SK Neptun
2001 – Anna-Karin Kammerling, Sundsvalls SS
2002 – Anna-Karin Kammerling, Sundsvalls SS
2003 – Emelie Kierkegaard, Spårvägens SF
2004 – Therese Alshammar, SK Neptun
2005 – Therese Alshammar, SK Neptun
2006 – Therese Alshammar, SK Neptun
2007 – Anna-Karin Kammerling, Sundsvalls SS

100m backstroke

1976 – Gunilla Lundberg, Borlänge SS
1977 – Cecilia Eklund, Täby Sim
1978 – Susanne Collgård, Karslunds IF
1979 – Ann Hultstrand, Malmö SS
1980 – Pensé Andersson, Landskrona SS
1981 – Johanna Holmén, Västerås SS
1982 – Annika Uvehall, Kristianstads SLS
1983 – Pensé Andersson, SK Ran
1984 – Anna-Karin Eriksson, Kalix SS
1985 – Camilla Olsson, SK Ran
1986 – Anna-Karin Eriksson, Kalix SS
1987 – Johanna Larsson, Mariestads SS
1988 – Johanna Larsson, Mariestads SS
1989 – Johanna Larsson, Mariestads SS
1990 – Camilla Olsson, Malmö KK
1991 – Ulrika Jardfeldt, Turebergs IF
1992 – Therese Alshammar, Järfälla SS
1993 – Therese Alshammar, SK Neptun
1994 – Therese Alshammar, SK Neptun
1995 – Therese Alshammar, SK Neptun
1996 – Therese Alshammar, Helsingborgs SS
1997 – Therese Alshammar, SK Neptun
1998 – Therese Alshammar, SK Neptun
1999 – Therese Alshammar, SK Neptun
2000 – Camilla Johansson, Trelleborgs SS
2001 – Camilla Johansson, Trelleborgs SS
2002 – Camilla Johansson, Trelleborgs SS
2003 – Camilla Johansson, Trelleborgs SS
2004 – Martina Svensson, Linköpings ASS
2005 – Carin Möller, Kalmar SS and Therese Svendsen, SK Ran
2006 – Therese Svendsen, SK Ran
2007 – Therese Svendsen, SK Ran

200m backstroke

1953 – Margareta Westesson, SK Poseidon
1954 – Margareta Westesson, SK Poseidon
1955 – Margareta Westesson, SK Poseidon
1956 – Margareta Westesson, SK Poseidon
1957 – Gull-Britt Jönsson, SK Poseidon
1958 – Bibbi Segerström, SK Neptun
1959 – Bibbi Segerström, SK Neptun
1960 – Bibbi Segerström, SK Neptun
1961 – Bibbi Segerström, SK Neptun
1962 – Lena Bengtsson, SK Neptun
1963 – Lena Bengtsson, SK Neptun
1964 – Lena Bengtsson, SK Neptun
1965 – Birgitta Haagman, Upsala SS
1966 – Birgitta Haagman, Upsala SS
1967 – Yvonne Törnqvist, Stockholmspolisens IF
1968 – Britt-Marie Hammarsten, Robertsfors SS
1969 – Eva Folkesson, Kristianstads SLS
1970 – Eva Folkesson, Kristianstads SLS
1971 – Anita Zarnowiecki, Simavdelningen 1902
1972 – Diana Olsson, Stockholmspolisens IF
1973 – Gunilla Lundberg, Umeå SS
1974 – Gunilla Lundberg, Umeå SS
1975 – Gunilla Lundberg, Umeå SS
1976 – Gunilla Lundberg, Umeå SS
1977 – Anette Lundström, SK GeMa
1978 – Pensé Andersson, Landskrona SS
1979 – Tina Gustafsson, Norrköpings KK
1980 – Pensé Andersson, Landskrona SS
1981 – Johanna Holmén, Västerås SS
1982 – Johanna Holmén, Västerås SS
1983 – Stina Enzell, Stockholmspolisens IF
1984 – Sofia Kraft, Götene SS
1985 – Sofia Kraft, SK Ran
1986 – Anna-Karin Eriksson, Kalix SS
1987 – Johanna Larsson, Mariestads SS
1988 – Johanna Larsson, Mariestads SS
1989 – Johanna Larsson, Mariestads SS
1990 – Camilla Olsson, Malmö KK
1991 – Annika Rasmusson, Malmö KK
1992 – Annika Rasmusson, Malmö KK
1993 – Camilla Johansson, Växjö SS
1994 – Magdalena Schultz, Södertälje SS
1995 – Camilla Johansson, Växjö SS
1996 – Camilla Johansson, Växjö SS
1997 – Camilla Johansson, Växjö SS
1998 – Therese Alshammar, SK Neptun
1999 – Therese Alshammar, SK Neptun
2000 – Sofia Svensson, SK Poseidon
2001 – Camilla Johansson, Trelleborgs SS
2002 – Camilla Johansson, Trelleborgs SS
2003 – Camilla Johansson, Trelleborgs SS
2004 – Carin Möller, Kalmar SS
2005 – Therese Svendsen, SK Ran
2006 – Therese Svendsen, SK Ran
2007 – Therese Svendsen, SK Ran

50m breaststroke

1990 – Louise Karlsson, Skärets SS
1991 – Louise Karlsson, Skärets SS
1992 – Louise Karlsson, Helsingborgs SS
1993 – Hanna Jaltner, Växjö SS
1994 – Emma Igelström, Karlshamns SS
1995 – Hanna Jaltner, Växjö SS
1996 – Hanna Jaltner, Växjö SS
1997 – Louise Karlsson, Skärets SS
1998 – Maria Östling, Södertörns SS
1999 – Maria Östling, Södertörns SS
2000 – Emma Igelström, Spårvägens SF
2001 – Emma Igelström, Spårvägens SF
2002 – Emma Igelström, Spårvägens SF
2003 – Emma Igelström, Spårvägens SF
2004 – Maria Östling, Södertörns SS
2005 – Rebecca Ejdervik, Täby Sim
2006 – Rebecca Ejdervik, Täby Sim
2007 – Hanna Westrin, Sundsvalls SS

100m breaststroke

1954 – Berit Mattsson, Örebro SS
1955 – Ulla-Britt Eklund, SK Neptun
1956 – Berit Mattsson, Örebro SS
1957 – Gun-Britt Mellberg, Brännans IF
1958 – Elisabeth Hernth, SK Ägir
1976 – Anette Fredriksson, Simavdelningen 1902
1977 – Eva-Marie Håkansson, Kristianstads SLS
1978 – Eva-Marie Håkansson, Kristianstads SLS
1979 – Eva-Marie Håkansson, Kristianstads SLS
1980 – Annelie Holmström, Stockholmspolisens IF
1981 – Annelie Holmström, Stockholmspolisens IF
1982 – Annelie Holmström, Stockholmspolisens IF
1983 – Annelie Holmström, Stockholmspolisens IF
1984 – Annelie Holmström, Stockholmspolisens IF
1985 – Annelie Holmström, Stockholmspolisens IF
1986 – Annelie Holmström, Stockholmspolisens IF
1987 – Lisa Lönn, SS Mora
1988 – Annelie Holmström, Stockholmspolisens IF
1989 – Anna-Karin Persson, Mölndals ASS
1990 – Louise Karlsson, Helsingborgs SS
1991 – Anna-Karin Persson, Mölndals ASS
1992 – Louise Karlsson, Helsingborgs SS
1993 – Hanna Jaltner, Växjö SS
1994 – Hanna Jaltner, Växjö SS
1995 – Hanna Jaltner, Växjö SS
1996 – Hanna Jaltner, Växjö SS
1997 – Hanna Jaltner, Växjö SS
1998 – Emma Igelström, Karlshamn SK
1999 – Maria Östling, Södertörns SS
2000 – Hanna Jaltner, Trelleborgs SS
2001 – Emma Igelström, Spårvägens SF
2002 – Emma Igelström, Spårvägens SF
2003 – Emma Igelström, Spårvägens SF
2004 – Maria Östling, Södertörns SS
2005 – Jeanette Engzell, Falu SS
2006 – Hanna Westrin, Sundsvalls SS
2007 – Hanna Westrin, Sundsvalls SS

200m breaststroke

1959 – Margareta Winquist, SK Neptun
1960 – Barbro Eriksson, Nyköpings SS
1961 – Christina Olsson, Limhamns SS
1962 – Christina Olsson, Limhamns SS
1963 – Christina Olsson, Limhamns SS
1964 – Monica Israelsson, Karlskrona SS
1965 – Monica Israelsson, Karlskrona SS
1966 – Monica Israelsson, Karlskrona SS
1967 – Agneta Haraldsson, Lycksele SS
1968 – Yvonne Brage, Skövde SS
1969 – Yvonne Brage, Skövde SS
1970 – Yvonne Brage, Skövde SS
1971 – Monica Bergqvist, Stockholmspolisens IF
1972 – Jeanette Petersson, IF Elfsborg
1973 – Jeanette Petersson, Spårvägens GoIF
1974 – Jeanette Petersson, SK Najaden
1975 – Ann-Sofi Roos, Kristianstads SLS
1976 – Ann-Sofi Roos, Kristianstads SLS
1977 – Ann-Sofi Roos, Kristianstads SLS
1978 – Eva-Marie Håkansson, Kristianstads SLS
1979 – Ann-Sofi Roos, Kristianstads SLS
1980 – Ann-Sofi Roos, Kristianstads SLS
1981 – Annelie Holmström, Stockholmspolisens IF
1982 – Annelie Holmström, Stockholmspolisens IF
1983 – Annelie Holmström, Stockholmspolisens IF
1984 – Annelie Holmström, Stockholmspolisens IF
1985 – Annelie Holmström, Stockholmspolisens IF
1986 – Annelie Holmström, Stockholmspolisens IF
1987 – Helena Kälvehed, SK Korrugal
1988 – Anna Rosengren, SS Mora
1989 – Anna-Karin Persson, Kungälvs SS
1990 – Charlotte Humling, Sandvikens SoHK
1991 – Anna Jensen, Växjö SS
1992 – Louise Karlsson, Helsingborgs SS
1993 – Hanna Jaltner, Växjö SS
1994 – Lena Eriksson, Spårvägens SF
1995 – Lena Eriksson, Spårvägens SF
1996 – Maria Östling, SS Mora
1997 – Lena Eriksson, Spårvägens SF
1998 – Emma Igelström, Karlshamn SK
1999 – Sara Nordenstam, Skärets SS
2000 – Sara Nordenstam, Skärets SS
2001 – Sara Nordenstam, Skärets SS
2002 – Emma Igelström, Spårvägens SF
2003 – Emma Igelström, Spårvägens SF
2004 – Sara Larsson, Ludvika SS
2005 – Sandra Jacobson, Täby Sim
2006 – Hanna Westrin, Sundsvalls SS
2007 – Joline Höstman, Göteborg Sim

50m butterfly

1990 – Louise Karlsson, Skärets SS
1991 – Louise Karlsson, Skärets SS
1992 – Louise Karlsson, Helsingborgs SS
1993 – Linda Olofsson, Sundsvalls SS
1994 – Linda Olofsson, Sundsvalls SS
1995 – Linda Olofsson, Södertälje SS
1996 – Linda Olofsson, Södertälje SS
1997 – Johanna Sjöberg, Helsingborgs SS
1998 – Johanna Sjöberg, Helsingborgs SS
1999 – Anna-Karin Kammerling, Sundsvalls SS
2000 – Anna-Karin Kammerling, Sundsvalls SS
2001 – Anna-Karin Kammerling, Sundsvalls SS
2002 – Anna-Karin Kammerling, Sundsvalls SS
2003 – Anna-Karin Kammerling, Sundsvalls SS
2004 – Anna-Karin Kammerling, Sundsvalls SS
2005 – Anna-Karin Kammerling, Sundsvalls SS
2006 – Therese Alshammar, SK Neptun
2007 – Anna-Karin Kammerling, Sundsvalls SS

100m butterfly

1953 – Ulla-Britt Eklund, SK Neptun
1959 – Kristina Larsson, SK Ran
1960 – Kristina Larsson, SK Ran
1961 – Karin Stenbäck, SK Neptun
1962 – Karin Stenbäck, SK Neptun
1963 – Karin Stenbäck, SK Neptun
1964 – Lotten Andersson, Timrå AIF
1965 – Lotten Andersson, Linköpings ASS
1966 – Ingrid Gustavsson, Luleå SS
1967 – Ingrid Gustavsson, Luleå SS
1976 – Gunilla Andersson, SK Neptun
1977 – Gunilla Andersson, SK Neptun
1978 – Lena de Val, Linköpings ASS
1979 – Agneta Mårtensson, Karslunds IF
1980 – Armi Airaksinen, Stockholmspolisens IF
1981 – Agneta Eriksson, Västerås SS
1982 – Agneta Eriksson, Västerås SS
1983 – Agneta Eriksson, Västerås SS
1984 – Agneta Eriksson, Västerås SS
1985 – Agneta Eriksson, Västerås SS
1986 – Agneta Eriksson, Västerås SS
1987 – Agneta Eriksson, Västerås SS
1988 – Annlo Edenholm, Södertörns SS
1989 – Anna Lindberg, Kristianstads SLS
1990 – Therèse Lundin, Simavdelningen 1902
1991 – Malin Strömberg, Ystads SS
1992 – Malin Strömberg, Ystads SS
1993 – Ellenor Svensson, Norrköpings KK
1994 – Ellenor Svensson, Norrköpings KK
1995 – Johanna Sjöberg, Helsingborgs SS
1996 – Malin Svahnström, Väsby SS
1997 – Johanna Sjöberg, Helsingborgs SS
1998 – Johanna Sjöberg, Helsingborgs SS
1999 – Johanna Sjöberg, Södertälje SS
2000 – Johanna Sjöberg, Södertälje SS
2001 – Johanna Sjöberg, Södertälje SS
2002 – Johanna Sjöberg, Södertälje SS
2003 – Anna-Karin Kammerling, Sundsvalls SS
2004 – Johanna Sjöberg, Spårvägens SF
2005 – Johanna Sjöberg, Spårvägens SF
2006 – Anna-Karin Kammerling, Sundsvalls SS
2007 – Petra Granlund, Väsby SS

200m butterfly

1968 – Ingrid Gustavsson, Luleå SS
1969 – Ingrid Gustavsson, Luleå SS
1970 – Eva Wikner, Stockholmspolisens IF
1971 – Eva Wikner, Stockholmspolisens IF
1972 – Eva Wikner, Stockholmspolisens IF
1973 – Gunilla Andersson, SK Neptun
1974 – Lena Johansson, Skellefteå-Rönnskärs SK
1975 – Gunilla Andersson, SK Neptun
1976 – Gunilla Andersson, SK Neptun
1977 – Lena de Val, Linköpings ASS
1978 – Lena de Val, Linköpings ASS
1979 – Agneta Mårtensson, Karslunds IF
1980 – Armi Airaksinen, Stockholmspolisens IF
1981 – Annelie Wennberg, Spårvägens GoIF
1982 – Annelie Wennberg, Spårvägens GoIF
1983 – Annelie Wennberg, Spårvägens GoIF
1984 – Ann Carlsson, Malmö KK
1985 – Eva Jonasson, Ölands SK
1986 – Eva Jonasson, Ölands SK
1987 – Annlo Edenholm, Södertörns SS
1988 – Annlo Edenholm, Södertörns SS
1989 – Carina Johansson, Oxelösunds SS
1990 – Therèse Lundin, Simavdelningen 1902
1991 – Mikaela Laurén, Stockholmspolisens IF
1992 – Malin Strömberg, Ystads SS
1993 – Christina Öhlund, Piteå Sim
1994 – Mikaela Laurén, Södertälje SS
1995 – Mikaela Laurén, SK Neptun
1996 – Mikaela Laurén, SK Neptun
1997 – Johanna Sjöberg, Helsingborgs SS
1998 – Destiny Laurén, SK Neptun
1999 – Johanna Sjöberg, Södertälje SS
2000 – Sara Nordenstam, Skärets SS
2001 – Sara Nordenstam, Väsby SS
2002 – Sara Nordenstam, Väsby SS
2003 – Mia Brodén, Falu SS
2004 – Johanna Sjöberg, Spårvägens SF
2005 – Petra Granlund, S77 Stenungsund
2006 – Gabriella Fagundez, SK Ran
2007 – Petra Granlund, Väsby SS

100m IM

1991 – Louise Karlsson, Skärets SS
1992 – Louise Karlsson, Helsingborgs SS
1993 – Ulrika Jardfeldt, Turebergs IF
1994 – Ulrika Jardfedt, Turebergs IF
1995 – Johanna Sjöberg, Helsingborgs SS
1996 – Veronika Andersson, Skärets SS
1997 – Louise Karlsson, Skärets SS
1998 – Kristina Sherman, Skärets SS
1999 – Malin Svahnström, Väsby SS
2000 – Therese Alshammar, SK Neptun
2001 – Therese Alshammar, SK Neptun
2002 – Therese Alshammar, SK Neptun
2003 – Hanna Eriksson, Södertälje SS
2004 – Hanna Eriksson, Södertälje SS
2005 – Hanna Eriksson, Södertälje SS
2006 – Hanna Eriksson, Södertälje SS
2007 – Malin Svahnström, Väsby SS

200m IM

1959 – Karin Larsson, SK Ran
1960 – Karin Larsson, SK Ran
1968 – Ingrid Gustavsson, Luleå SS
1969 – Anita Zarnowiecki, Simavdelningen 1902
1970 – Anita Zarnowiecki, Simavdelningen 1902
1971 – Anita Zarnowiecki, Simavdelningen 1902
1976 – Diana Olsson, Stockholmspolisens IF
1977 – Anette Fredriksson, Simavdelningen 1902
1978 – Anette Fredriksson, Simavdelningen 1902
1979 – Ann-Sofi Roos, Kristianstads SLS
1980 – Ann-Sofi Roos, Kristianstads SLS
1981 – Anette Philipsson, Linköpings ASS
1982 – Anette Philipsson, Linköpings ASS
1983 – Maria Kardum, Kristianstads SLS
1984 – Sofia Kraft, Götene SS
1985 – Anette Philipsson, Linköpings ASS
1986 – Helena Kälvehed, SK Korrugal
1987 – Anette Philipsson, Linköpings ASS
1988 – Anette Philipsson, Linköpings ASS
1989 – Helena Kälvehed, SK Korrugal
1990 – Malin Gustavsson, Kristianstads SLS
1991 – Helena Kälvehed, Norrköpings KK
1992 – Louise Karlsson, Helsingborgs SS
1993 – Ulrika Jardfeldt, Turebergs IF
1994 – Magdalena Schultz, Södertälje SS
1995 – Magdalena Schultz, Södertälje SS
1996 – Malin Svahnström, Väsby SS
1997 – Malin Svahnström, Väsby SS
1998 – Malin Svahnström, Väsby SS
1999 – Malin Svahnström, Väsby SS
2000 – Sara Nordenstam, Skärets SS
2001 – Sara Nordenstam, Skärets SS
2002 – Sara Nordenstam, Väsby SS
2003 – Hanna Eriksson, Södertälje SS
2004 – Hanna Eriksson, Södertälje SS
2005 – Malin Svahnström, Väsby SS
2006 – Stina Gardell, Spårvägens SF
2007 – Stina Gardell, Spårvägens SF

400m IM

1972 – Anita Zarnowiecki, Simavdelningen 1902
1973 – Anita Zarnowiecki, Simavdelningen 1902
1974 – Anita Zarnowiecki, Simavdelningen 1902
1975 – Anita Zarnowiecki, Simavdelningen 1902
1976 – Ann-Sofi Roos, Kristianstads SLS
1977 – Ann-Sofi Roos, Kristianstads SLS
1978 – Ann-Sofi Roos, Kristianstads SLS
1979 – Ann-Sofi Roos, Kristianstads SLS
1980 – Ann-Sofi Roos, Kristianstads SLS
1981 – Anette Philipsson, Linköpings ASS
1982 – Anette Philipsson, Linköpings ASS
1983 – Sofia Kraft, SK Götene
1984 – Sofia Kraft, SK Götene
1985 – Sofia Kraft, SK Ran
1986 – Anette Philipsson, Linköpings ASS
1987 – Anette Philipsson, Linköpings ASS
1988 – Anette Philipsson, Linköpings ASS
1989 – Anette Philipsson, Linköpings ASS
1990 – Andrea Bohlin, Växjö SS
1991 – Ann-Sofie Jönsson, Tunafors SK
1992 – Ann-Sofie Jönsson, Tunafors SK
1993 – Anna Nilsson, Södertälje SS
1994 – Magdalena Schultz, Södertälje SS
1995 – Mikaela Laurén, SK Neptun
1996 – Malin Svahnström, Väsby SS
1997 – Destiny Laurén, SK Neptun
1998 – Malin Svahnström, Väsby SS
1999 – Emely Zakrisson, Stockholms KK
2000 – Sara Nordenstam, Skärets SS
2001 – Sara Nordenstam, Väsby SS
2002 – Sara Nordenstam, Väsby SS
2003 – Malin Fredriksson, Kalmar SS
2004 – Ann Berglund, Jönköpings SS
2005 – Sara Thydén, Kalmar SS
2006 – Sara Thydén, Kalmar SS
2006 – Ida Sandin, Väsby SS

4x50m freestyle relay

1953 – SK Neptun
1954 – SK Neptun
1955 – SK Neptun
1956 – SK Neptun
1957 – SK Neptun
1958 – SK Neptun (Anita Hellström, Jane Cederqvist, Tanya Nilsson, Bibbi Segerström)
1990 – Helsingborgs SS
1991 – Malmö KK
1992 – Helsingborgs SS
1993 – Norrköpings KK (Ellenor Svensson, Petra Meuller, Viktoria Ekberg, Helena Kälvehed)
1994 – Södertälje SS (Magdalena Schultz, Sofi Nygren, Anna-Karin Rantzow, Susanne Lööw)
1995 – Södertälje SS (Linda Olofsson, Susanne Lööw, Sofi Nygren, Anna-Karin Rantzow)
1996 – Helsingborgs SS
1997 – Helsingborgs SS
1998 – Helsingborgs SS
1999 – SK Neptun (Mia Ydfors, Kia Kilpinen, Jessica Lidström, Therese Alshammar)
2000 – Södertälje SS (Johanna Sjöberg, Linnea Tossavainen, Marianne Lionell, Hanna Eriksson)
2001 – Södertälje SS (Johanna Sjöberg, Marianne Lionell, Linnea Tossavainen, Hanna Eriksson)
2002 – Södertälje SS (Johanna Sjöberg, Hanna Eriksson, Marianne Lionell, Linnea Tossavainen)
2003 – Sundsvalls SS (Lorraine Flores, Anna-Karin Kammerling, Martina Lodin, Jenny Lindström)
2004 – Väsby SS (Gabriella Fagundez, Therese Mattsson, Josefin Lillhage, Denise Helgesson)
2005 – Väsby SS (Gabriella Fagundez, Malin Svahnström, Josefin Lillhage, Denise Helgesson)
2006 – SK Neptun (Annalena Hansson, Hanna Lundström, Cathrin Carlzon, Therese Alshammar)
2007 – Väsby SS (Petra Granlund, Therese Mattsson, Malin Svahnström, Ida Sandin)

4x100m freestyle relay

1959 – SK Neptun (Tanya Nilsson, Barbro Lundquist, Jane Cederqvist, Bibbi Segerström)
1960 – SK Neptun (Tanya Nilsson, Jane Cederqvist, Karin Stenbäck, Bibbi Segerström)
1961 – SK Neptun (Margareta Rylander, Jane Cederqvist, Karin Stenbäck, Bibbi Segerström)
1962 – SK Neptun
1963 – SK Neptun
1964 – SK Neptun
1965 – SK Neptun
1966 – SK Neptun
1967 – Västerås SS
1968 – Västerås SS
1969 – Västerås SS
1970 – Stockholms KK
1971 – Malmö SS
1976 – Simavdelningen 1902
1977 – Kristianstads SLS
1978 – Kristianstads SLS
1979 – Kristianstads SLS
1980 – Kristianstads SLS
1981 – Stockholmspolisens IF
1982 – Stockholmspolisens IF
1983 – Stockholmspolisens IF
1984 – Stockholmspolisens IF
1985 – Kristianstads SLS
1986 – Kristianstads SLS
1987 – Kristianstads SLS
1988 – Kristianstads SLS
1989 – Helsingborgs SS (Suzanne Nilsson, Anna Hansen, Helena Åberg, Britt-Marie Nilsson)
1990 – Malmö KK
1991 – Malmö KK
1992 – Helsingborgs SS
1993 – Norrköpings KK (Petra Meuller, Viktoria Ekberg, Helena Kälvehed, Ellenor Svensson)
1994 – Södertälje SS (Magdalena Schultz, Susanne Lööw, Sofi Nygren, Anna-Karin Rantzow)
1995 – Södertälje SS (Magdalena Schultz, Susanne Lööw, Linda Olofsson, Anna-Karin Rantzow)
1996 – Helsingborgs SS
1997 – Helsingborgs SS
1998 – SK Neptun
1999 – Malmö KK (Lotta Wänberg, Jenny Redlund, Camilla Helgesson, Lisa Wänberg)
2000 – SK Neptun (Jessica Lidström, Mia Ydfors, Annelie Andersson, Therese Alshammar)
2001 – Trelleborgs SS (Caroline Steffensen, Emma Pålsson, Ida Mattsson, Sandra Steffensen)
2002 – Södertälje SS (Johanna Sjöberg, Hanna Eriksson, Marianne Lionell, Linnea Tossavainen)
2003 – Väsby SS (Gabriella Fagundez, Josefin Lillhage, Denise Helgesson, Therese Mattsson)
2004 – Väsby SS (Therese Mattsson, Josefin Lillhage, Gabriella Fagundez, Denise Helgesson)
2005 – Väsby SS (Therese Mattsson, Josefin Lillhage, Gabriella Fagundez, Malin Svahnström)
2006 – Väsby SS (Ida Sandin, Josefin Lillhage, Malin Svahnström, Petra Granlund)
2007 – Väsby SS (Ida Sandin, Therese Mattsson, Malin Svahnström, Petra Granlund)

4x200m freestyle relay

1972 – Kristianstads SLS
1973 – SK Najaden
1974 – Kristianstads SLS
1975 – SK Najaden
1976 – Borlänge SS
1977 – Borlänge SS
1978 – Kristianstads SLS
1979 – Kristianstads SLS
1980 – Kristianstads SLS
1981 – Västerås SS
1982 – Stockholmspolisens IF
1983 – Stockholmspolisens IF
1984 – Stockholmspolisens IF
1985 – Kristianstads SLS
1986 – Kristianstads SLS
1987 – Kristianstads SLS
1988 – Kristianstads SLS
1989 – Helsingborgs SS (Suzanne Nilsson, Anna Hansen, Helena Åberg, Britt-Marie Nilsson)
1994 – Malmö KK
1995 – Södertälje SS (Magdalena Schultz, Anna-Karin Rantzow, Linda Olofsson, Susanne Lööw)
1996 – Simavdelningen 1902
1997 – Helsingborgs SS
1998 – Malmö KK
1999 – Malmö KK (Lotta Wänberg, Lisa Wänberg, Jenny Redlund, Camilla Helgesson)
2000 – SK Neptun (Jessica Lidström, Mia Ydfors, Annelie Andersson, Destiny Laurén)
2001 – Malmö KK (Linn Akkad, Linda Erlandsson, Jenny Redlund, Helen Svensson)
2002 – Väsby SS (Josefin Lillhage, Sara Nordenstam, Gabriella Fagundez, Denise Helgesson)
2003 – SK Neptun (Minna Ahonpää, Therese Alshammar, Destiny Laurén, Mia Ydfors)
2004 – Malmö KK (Lotta Wänberg, Lisa Wänberg, Ida Mattsson, Maria Öberg)
2005 – Väsby SS (Therese Mattsson, Josefin Lillhage, Gabriella Fagundez, Malin Svahnström)
2006 – Väsby SS (Ida Sandin, Josefin Lillhage, Malin Svahnström, Petra Granlund)
2007 – SK Ran (Nelly Nilsson, Gabriella Fagundez, Ida Marko-Varga, Therese Svendsen)

4x50m medley relay

1994 – Södertälje SS (Magdalena Schultz, Charlotte Humling, Anna-Karin Rantzow, Susanne Lööw)
1995 – Spårvägens SF
1996 – Helsingborgs SS
1997 – Helsingborgs SS
1998 – Södertälje SS
1999 – Spårvägens SF (Emelie Kierkegaard, Emma Igelström, Anna Gustavsson, Louise Jöhncke)
2000 – SK Neptun (Ulrika Jardfeldt, Malou Serneholt, Therese Alshammar, Mia Ydfors)
2001 – Södertälje SS (Hanna Eriksson, Marianne Lionell, Johanna Sjöberg, Linnea Tossavainen)
2002 – Södertälje SS (Hanna Eriksson, Marianne Lionell, Johanna Sjöberg, Linnea Tossavainen)
2003 – Sundsvalls SS (Jenny Lindström, Emma Svanbäck, Anna-Karin Kammerling, Lorraine Flores)
2004 – Malmö KK (Emma Holmquist, Sanja Dizdarevic, Lena Hallander, Lisa Wänberg)
2005 – Spårvägens SF (Emelie Kierkegaard, Stina Mittermaier, Johanna Sjöberg, Stina Gardell)
2006 – Sundsvalls SS (Jenny Lindström, Hanna Westrin, Anna-Karin Kammerling, Alexandra Johansson)
2007 – Sundsvalls SS (Alexandra Johansson, Hanna Westrin, Anna-Karin Kammerling, Josefina Lockner)

4x100m medley relay

1968 – Stockholmspolisens IF
1969 – Stockholmspolisens IF
1970 – Stockholmspolisens IF
1971 – Stockholmspolisens IF
1972 – Stockholmspolisens IF
1973 – SK Najaden
1974 – SK Najaden
1975 – SK Najaden
1976 – Simavdelningen 1902
1977 – Kristianstads SLS
1978 – Kristianstads SLS
1979 – Stockholmspolisens IF
1980 – Kristianstads SLS
1981 – Västerås SS
1982 – Stockholmspolisens IF
1983 – Stockholmspolisens IF
1984 – Stockholmspolisens IF
1985 – SK Ran
1986 – Stockholmspolisens IF
1987 – Mariestads SS
1988 – Kristianstads SLS
1989 – Kristianstads SLS
1990 – Malmö KK
1991 – Malmö KK
1992 – Helsingborgs SS
1993 – Växjö SS
1994 – Södertälje SS (Magdalena Schultz, Charlotte Humling, Anna-Karin Rantzow, Susanne Lööw)
1995 – Växjö SS
1996 – Helsingborgs SS
1997 – Helsingborgs SS
1998 – Väsby SS
1999 – Södertälje SS (Lisa Nilsson, Linnea Tossavainen, Johanna Sjöberg, Sofi Nygren)
2000 – Trelleborgs SS (Camilla Johansson, Hanna Jaltner, Emma Pålsson, Sandra Steffensen)
2001 – Trelleborgs SS (Camilla Johansson, Hanna Jaltner, Ida Mattsson, Sandra Steffensen)
2002 – Väsby SS (Denise Helgesson, Sara Nordenstam, Gabriella Fagundez, Josefin Lillhage)
2003 – Sundsvalls SS (Emma Wallin, Emma Svanbäck, Jenny Lindström, Anna-Karin Kammerling)
2004 – SK Neptun (Therese Alshammar, Katarina Tour, Mikaela Laurén, Minna Ahonpää)
2005 – Väsby SS (Malin Svahnström, Elin Törnbladh, Gabriella Fagundez, Josefin Lillhage)
2006 – SK Ran (Therese Svendsen, Caroline Drab, Gabriella Fagundez, Ida Marko-Varga)
2007 – SK Ran (Therese Svendsen, Caroline Drab, Gabriella Fagundez, Ida Marko-Varga)

Discontinued events

1500m freestyle

1979 – Susanne Ackum, Borlänge SS
1980 – Pernilla Henriksson, Växjö SS
1981 – Ann Linder, SK Najaden
1982 – Ann Linder, SK Najaden
1983 – Ann Linder, SK Najaden
1984 – Ann-Charlotte Brodén, Motala SS

4x100m backstroke

1961 – SK Neptun (Birgitta Fribergh, M Öhman, M Öberg, Bibbi Segerström)
1962 – SK Neptun
1963 – SK Neptun
1964 – Malmö SS
1965 – Malmö SS
1966 – Upsala SS

4x100m breaststroke

1961 – Nyköpings SS (L Jansson, K Kallerhult, M Gustavsson, Barbro Eriksson)
1962 – Malmö SS
1963 – Malmö SS
1964 – Malmö SS
1965 – SK Poseidon
1966 – Bodens BK
1967 – SK GeMa Gällivare

4x100m butterfly

1961 – SK Ran (Barbro Andersson, Karin Larsson, Nin Persson, Kristina Larsson)
1962 – SK Neptun
1963 – SK Neptun
1964 – SK Neptun
1965 – Gävle SS
1966 – Upsala SS
1967 – Gävle SS

References
Alm, B. (2004). Historiska simtag: Svensk simidrott under hundra ar, Solna: Svenska Simförbundet

Swedish Short Course Swimming Championships
Short Course Swimming Championships champions